Blue and gold fusilier is a common name for several fishes and may refer to:

Caesio caerulaurea
Caesio teres